Perry-Cherry House is a historic home located at Mount Olive, Wayne County, North Carolina.  It was built about 1904 and altered in 1933–1936.  It is a two-story, three bay, frame dwelling with Classical Revival and Colonial Revival style elements.  It has a nearly pyramidal hip roof and hip roofed rear two-story ell.  The front facade features a two-story Classical semi-circular portico which is supported by monumental Ionic order columns. It was the home of L. G. and Bessie Welling Geddie, original investors in the Mt. Olive Pickle Company.

It was listed on the National Register of Historic Places in 1986. It is located in the Mount Olive Historic District.

References

Houses on the National Register of Historic Places in North Carolina
Colonial Revival architecture in North Carolina
Neoclassical architecture in North Carolina
Houses completed in 1904
Houses in Wayne County, North Carolina
National Register of Historic Places in Wayne County, North Carolina
Historic district contributing properties in North Carolina